This is a list of species of fruit flies (Tephritidae) in the genus Zeugodacus, as of 2019.

 Zeugodacus abdoangustus (Drew 1972)
 Zeugodacus abdoaurantiacus (Drew 1989)
 Zeugodacus abdopallescens (Drew 1971)
 Zeugodacus ablepharus (Bezzi 1919)
 Zeugodacus abnormis (Hardy 1982)
 Zeugodacus absolutus (Walker 1861)
 Zeugodacus aithonota (Drew & Romig 2013)
 Zeugodacus alampetus (Drew 1989)
 Zeugodacus ambiguus (Shiraki 1933)
 Zeugodacus amoenus (Drew 1972)
 Zeugodacus analus (Chen & Zhou 2013)
 Zeugodacus anchitrichotus (Drew 1989)
 Zeugodacus angusticostatus (Drew 1989)
 Zeugodacus angustifinis (Hardy 1982)
 Zeugodacus apicalis (de Meijere 1911)
 Zeugodacus apiciflavus (Yu He & Chen 2011)
 Zeugodacus apicofemoralis (Drew & Romig 2013)
 Zeugodacus areolatus (Walker 1861)
 Zeugodacus arisanicus (Shiraki 1933)
 Zeugodacus armillatus (Hering 1938)
 Zeugodacus assamensis White 1999
 Zeugodacus atrichus (Bezzi 1919)
 Zeugodacus atrifacies (Perkins 1938)
 Zeugodacus atrisetosus (Perkins 1939)
 Zeugodacus atypicus (White & Evenhuis 1999)
 Zeugodacus aurantiventer (Drew 1989)
 Zeugodacus bakeri (Bezzi 1919)
 Zeugodacus baliensis (Drew & Romig 2013)
 Zeugodacus baoshanensis (Zhang, Ji & Chen 2011)
 Zeugodacus biguttatus (Bezzi 1916)
 Zeugodacus binoyi (Drew 2002)
 Zeugodacus bogorensis (Hardy 1983)
 Zeugodacus borongensis (Drew & Romig 2013)
 Zeugodacus brachus (Drew 1972)
 Zeugodacus brevipunctatus (David & Hancock 2017)
 Zeugodacus brevivitta (Drew & Romig 2013)
 Zeugodacus buruensis (White 1999)
 Zeugodacus buvittatus (Drew 1989)
 Zeugodacus calumniatus (Hardy 1970)
 Zeugodacus careomacula (Drew & Romig 2013)
 Zeugodacus caudatus (Fabricius 1805)
 Zeugodacus choristus (May 1962)
 Zeugodacus cilifer (Hendel 1912)
 Zeugodacus citrifuscus (Drew & Romig 2013)
 Zeugodacus citroides (Drew 1989)
 Zeugodacus complicatus (White 1999)
 Zeugodacus connexus (Hardy 1982)
 Zeugodacus cucumis (French 1907)
 Zeugodacus cucurbitae (Coquillett 1899)
 Zeugodacus curtus (Drew 1972)
 Zeugodacus daclaciae (Drew & Romig 2013)
 Zeugodacus daulus (Drew 1989)
 Zeugodacus decipiens (Drew 1972)
 Zeugodacus depressus (Shiraki 1933)
 Zeugodacus diaphoropsis (Hering 1952)
 Zeugodacus diaphorus (Hendel 1915)
 Zeugodacus dissidens (Drew 1989)
 Zeugodacus disturgidus (Yu, Deng & Chen 2012)
 Zeugodacus diversus (Coquillett 1904)
 Zeugodacus dorsirufus (Drew & Romig 2013)
 Zeugodacus dubiosus (Hardy 1982)
 Zeugodacus duplicatus (Bezzi 1916)
 Zeugodacus elegantulus (Hardy 1974)
 Zeugodacus emarginatus (Perkins 1939)
 Zeugodacus emittens (Walker 1860)
 Zeugodacus eurylomatus (Hardy 1982)
 Zeugodacus exornatus (Hering 1941)
 Zeugodacus fallacis (Drew 1972)
 Zeugodacus fereuncinatus (Drew & Romig 2013)
 Zeugodacus flavipilosus (Hardy 1982)
 Zeugodacus flavolateralis (Drew & Romig 2013)
 Zeugodacus flavopectoralis (Hering 1953)
 Zeugodacus flavoverticalis (Drew & Romig 2013)
 Zeugodacus freidbergi (White 1999)
 Zeugodacus fulvipes (Perkins 1938)
 Zeugodacus fulvoabdominalis (White & Evenhuis 1999)
 Zeugodacus fuscans (Wang 1998)
 Zeugodacus fuscipennulus (Drew & Romig 2001)
 Zeugodacus fuscoalatus (Drew & Romig 2013)
 Zeugodacus gavisus (Munro 1935)
 Zeugodacus gracilis (Drew 1972)
 Zeugodacus hamaceki (Drew & Romig 2001)
 Zeugodacus hancocki (Drew & Romig 2013)
 Zeugodacus hatyaiensis (Drew & Romig 2013)
 Zeugodacus havelockiae (Drew & Romig 2013)
 Zeugodacus heinrichi (Hering 1941)
 Zeugodacus hekouanus (Yu He & Yang 2011)
 Zeugodacus hengsawadae (Drew & Romig 2013)
 Zeugodacus hoabinhiae (Drew & Romig 2013)
 Zeugodacus hochii (Zia 1936)
 Zeugodacus hodgsoniae (Drew & Romig 2013)
 Zeugodacus hoedi (White 1999)
 Zeugodacus hululangatiae (Drew & Romig 2013)
 Zeugodacus incisus (Walker 1861)
 Zeugodacus indentus (Hardy 1974)
 Zeugodacus infestus (Enderlein 1920)
 Zeugodacus iriomotiae (Drew & Romig 2013)
 Zeugodacus ishigakiensis (Shiraki 1933)
 Zeugodacus isolatus (Hardy 1973)
 Zeugodacus javadicus (Mahmood 1999)
 Zeugodacus javanensis (Perkins 1938)
 Zeugodacus juxtuncinatus (Drew & Romig 2013)
 Zeugodacus kaghanae (Mahmood 1999)
 Zeugodacus khaoyaiae (Drew & Romig 2013)
 Zeugodacus laguniensis (Drew & Romig 2013)
 Zeugodacus lipsanus (Hendel 1915)
 Zeugodacus liquidus (Drew & Romig 2013)
 Zeugodacus longicaudatus (Perkins 1938)
 Zeugodacus longivittatus (Chua & Ooi 1998)
 Zeugodacus luteicinctutus (Ito 2011)
 Zeugodacus macrophyllae (Drew & Romig 2013)
 Zeugodacus macrovittatus (Drew 1989)
 Zeugodacus maculatus (Perkins 1938)
 Zeugodacus maculifacies (Hardy 1973)
 Zeugodacus maculifemur (Hering 1938)
 Zeugodacus madhupuri (Leblanc, Luc & Hossain, Md & Doorenweerd, Camiel & Khan, Shakil & Momen, Mahfuza & San Jose, Michael & Rubinoff, Daniel. 2019)
 Zeugodacus magnicauda (White & Evenhuis 1999)
 Zeugodacus melanofacies (Drew & Romig 2013)
 Zeugodacus melanopsis (Hardy 1982)
 Zeugodacus menglanus (Yu Liu & Yang 2011)
 Zeugodacus mesonotaitha (Drew 1989)
 Zeugodacus minimus (Hering 1952)
 Zeugodacus montanus (Hardy 1983)
 Zeugodacus mukiae (Drew & Romig 2013)
 Zeugodacus mundus (Bezzi 1919)
 Zeugodacus nakhonnayokiae (Drew & Romig 2013)
 Zeugodacus namlingiae (Drew & Romig 2013)
 Zeugodacus neoelegantulus (White 1999)
 Zeugodacus neoemittens (Drew & Romig 2013)
 Zeugodacus neoflavipilosus (Drew & Romig 2013)
 Zeugodacus neolipsanus (Drew & Romig 2013)
 Zeugodacus neopallescentis (Drew 1989)
 Zeugodacus nigrifacies (Shiraki 1933)
 Zeugodacus ochrosterna (Drew & Romig 2013)
 Zeugodacus okunii (Shiraki 1933)
 Zeugodacus pahangiae (Drew & Romig 2013)
 Zeugodacus pantabanganiae (Drew & Romig 2013)
 Zeugodacus papuaensis (Malloch 1939)
 Zeugodacus paululus (Drew 1989)
 Zeugodacus pemalangiae (Drew & Romig 2013)
 Zeugodacus perplexus (Walker 1862)
 Zeugodacus perpusillus (Drew 1971)
 Zeugodacus persignatus (Hering 1941)
 Zeugodacus platamus (Hardy 1973)
 Zeugodacus proprescutellatus (Zhang Che & Gao 2011)
 Zeugodacus pubescens (Bezzi 1919)
 Zeugodacus purus (White 1999)
 Zeugodacus quasiinfestus (Drew & Romig 2013)
 Zeugodacus reflexus (Drew 1971)
 Zeugodacus rubellus (Hardy 1973)
 Zeugodacus sabahensis (Drew & Romig 2013)
 Zeugodacus sandaracinus (Drew 1989)
 Zeugodacus sasaotiae (Drew & Romig 2013)
 Zeugodacus scutellaris (Bezzi 1913)
 Zeugodacus scutellarius (Bezzi 1916)
 Zeugodacus scutellatus (Hendel 1912)
 Zeugodacus scutellinus (Bezzi 1916)
 Zeugodacus semisurstyli Drew & Romig 2013
 Zeugodacus semongokensis (Drew & Romig 2013)
 Zeugodacus sepikae (Drew 1989)
 Zeugodacus signatifer (Tryon 1927)
 Zeugodacus signatus (Hering 1941)
 Zeugodacus sinensis (Yu Bai & Chen 2011)
 Zeugodacus singularis (Drew 1989)
 Zeugodacus sonlaiae (Drew & Romig 2013)
 Zeugodacus speciosus (Drew & Romig 2013)
 Zeugodacus spectabilis (Drew & Romig 2013)
 Zeugodacus strigifinis (Walker 1861)
 Zeugodacus sumbensis (Hering 1953)
 Zeugodacus surrufulus (Drew 1989)
 Zeugodacus synnephes (Hendel 1913)
 Zeugodacus tapervitta (Mahmood 1999)
 Zeugodacus tappanus (Shiraki 1933)
 Zeugodacus tau (Walker 1849)
 Zeugodacus tebeduiae (Drew & Romig 2013)
 Zeugodacus timorensis (Perkins 1939)
 Zeugodacus transversus (Hardy 1982)
 Zeugodacus triangularis (Drew 1968)
 Zeugodacus trichosanthes (Drew & Romig 2013)
 Zeugodacus trichotus (May 1962)
 Zeugodacus tricuspidatae (Drew & Romig 2013)
 Zeugodacus trilineatus (Hardy 1955)
 Zeugodacus trimaculatus (Hardy & Adachi 1954)
 Zeugodacus trivandrumensis (Drew & Romig 2013)
 Zeugodacus ujungpandangiae (Drew & Romig 2013)
 Zeugodacus uncinatus (Drew & Romig 2013)
 Zeugodacus unilateralis (Drew 1989)
 Zeugodacus univittatus (Drew 1972)
 Zeugodacus urens (White 1999)
 Zeugodacus vargus (Hardy 1982)
 Zeugodacus vinnulus (Hardy 1973)
 Zeugodacus vultus (Hardy 1973)
 Zeugodacus waimitaliae (Drew & Romig 2013)
 Zeugodacus watersi (Hardy 1954)
 Zeugodacus whitei (Drew & Romig 2013)
 Zeugodacus yalaensis (Drew & Romig 2013)
 Zeugodacus yoshimotoi (Hardy 1973)
 Zeugodacus zahadi (Mahmood 1999)

References

Dacinae
Lists of insect species